EUT may refer to:

 Eindhoven University of Technology, in Eindhoven, Netherlands
 Equipment under test
 European University of Tirana, in Tirana, Albania
 European Urology Today, a scientific journal
 European 2000 Airlines, a defunct airline of Malta
 EUT, an alternative rockband from the Netherlands